Elsa Zamparelli (born December 8, 1944) is a costume designer who is best known for her work on Dances with Wolves and The Last of the Mohicans.

She was nominated at the 63rd Academy Awards for Best Costumes for her work on Dances with Wolves.

Selected filmography 
 The Order (2001)
 Ace Ventura: When Nature Calls (1995)
 Last of the Dogmen (1995)
 The Last of the Mohicans (1992)
 Dances with Wolves (1990)

References

External links
 

1944 births
American costume designers
Women costume designers
Living people
Daytime Emmy Award winners